Comté (or Gruyère de Comté) is a French cheese made from unpasteurized cow's milk in the Franche-Comté region of eastern France bordering Switzerland and sharing much of its cuisine. Comté has the highest production of all French Appellation d'origine contrôlée (AOC) cheeses, at around 66,500 tonnes annually. It is classified as an Alpine cheese.

The rind is usually a dusty-brown colour, and the internal paste, pâte, is a pale creamy yellow. The texture is relatively hard and flexible, and the taste is mild and slightly sweet.

Production
Fresh from the farm, milk is poured into large copper vats where it is gently warmed. Rennet is added, causing the milk to coagulate. The curds are then cut into tiny white grains that are the size of rice or wheat which are then stirred before being heated again for around 30 minutes. The contents are then placed into moulds and the whey is pressed out. After several hours the mould is opened and left to mature in cellars, first for a few weeks at the dairy, and then over several months elsewhere.

The manufacture of Comté has been controlled by AOC regulations since it became one of the first cheeses to receive AOC recognition in 1958, with full regulations introduced in 1976. The AOC regulations for Comté prescribe:

 Only milk from Montbéliarde or French Simmental cows (or cross breeds of the two) is permitted.
 There must be no more than 1.3 cows per hectare of pasture.
 Fertilization of pasture is limited, and cows may only be fed fresh, natural feed, with no silage.
 The milk must be transported to the site of production immediately after milking.
 Renneting must be carried out within a stipulated time after milking, according to the storage temperature of the milk.
 The milk must be used raw. Only one heating of the milk may occur, and that must be during renneting. The milk may be heated up to 56C / 133F.
 Salt may only be applied directly to the surface of the cheese.
 A casein label containing the date of production must be attached to the side of the cheese, and maturing must continue for at least four months.
 No grated cheese could be sold under the Comté name between 1979 and 2007.

In 2005 the French Government registered 175 producers and 188 affineurs (agers) in France.

Grading

Each cheese is awarded a score out of 20 by inspectors, according to 'overall appearance' (up 1 point), 'quality of rind' (1.5), 'internal appearance' (3.5), 'texture' (5), and taste (9). Those scoring >14 points, called Comté Extra, are given a green casein label with the recognizable logo of a green bell. Those cheeses scoring 12-14 points are given a brown label and are simply called Comté (see picture with different labels). Any cheese scoring 1-2 points (out of a possible 9) for taste, or <12 overall is prohibited from being named Comté and is sold for other purposes.

Jury terroir

Comté is well known for its distinct terroir: it is made in 160 village-based fruitières (cheese-making facilities) in the region, owned by farmers who bring their own milk from their cows; strict production rules linking place and product; and the seasonal environmental effects. Comté cheeses go through the process of "jury terroir", where panels of trained volunteer tasters from Comté supply chain and from the region discuss and publish bi-monthly in the newsletter Les Nouvelles de Comté about the taste and their results. This jury terroir was created by Florence Bérodier, the food scientist, to elaborate in response to a set of formidable challenges that Comté cheese underwent in the beginning for its unfamiliar taste and smell. "The jury terroir is there to speak of all the richness in the tastes of a Comté…" – original member confirmed. For Comté cheese to be worldly renowned, the quality improved, but the challenge stand still to create a uniform taste, which was impossible to achieve since there were 160 different fruitières specializing. But through the process of jury terroir, people came to focus on communication among the tasters, which improved their ability to perceive and gained in value. They acquired a general culture that enabled to describe and exchange about the taste of Comtés.

See also
 List of cheeses

References

External links

Official UK Comté Cheese website

French cheeses
French products with protected designation of origin
Cow's-milk cheeses
Cheeses with designation of origin protected in the European Union